Deolinda Lopes Vieira (18881993), a primary school teacher, was an anarcho-syndicalist activist and a feminist, who played an important role in Portugal's Conselho Nacional das Mulheres Portuguesas (National Council of Portuguese Women - CNMP).

Early life
Deolinda Lopes Vieira was born on 8 July 1888, in the city of Beja in the Alentejo region of Portugal. She was the daughter of Maria Claudina Lopes, an unmarried domestic servant, who came from the Algarve, and José Gonçalves Vieira, a traveling salesman, who only formally acknowledged his paternity in 1894. After attending primary school in her hometown, she moved with her family to the Portuguese capital of Lisbon at the age of 12. She completed her primary school course at the Escola Normal Primária de Lisboa, which was at the time a progressive institution that aimed to bring about pedagogical and social reforms.

Activism and marriage
At a young age Lopes Vieira began to get involved in various political and civil rights causes, becoming an enthusiastic member of the Republican Party, which aimed to overthrow the Portuguese monarchy. She also became a feminist and anarcho-syndicalist, participating in the strike of academics against the government in 1907. In 1910, she started working as a teacher at the Escola-Oficina Nº 1 in Lisbon. After the overthrow of the monarchy in 1910, and despite her humble origins, she quickly managed to insert herself into Portuguese intellectual circles. At the Second Portuguese Congress of Free thought she met her husband, António Pinto Quartin, a Brazilian intellectual and activist of Portuguese origin. In 1913, she left for Brazil, accompanying her husband who had been expelled from Portugal due to his anarchist views. She remained there until 1915, when the family was allowed to return to Portugal.

Teaching and the women's movement
After returning from Brazil, Lopes Vieira returned to work at Escola-Oficina Nº 1, which her children would attend. This school, with a libertarian and masonic approach, was closed after the 28 May 1926 coup d'état that installed the authoritarian Estado Novo government. This forced Lopes Vieira to transfer to a government school, where she remained until her retirement. In 1919 she also joined the Lisbon Normal School, obtaining a diploma in early childhood education. By this time the Republican government had begun to introduce pre-school education. In 1923, she became a freemason, joining a branch of the French Ordre maçonnique mixte international - le Droit humain and being one of the founders of the Humanity Masonic Lodge in Lisbon in 1923. She also joined the Conselho Nacional das Mulheres Portuguesas (National Council of Portuguese Women - CNMP), remaining a member until its forced closure in 1947. Together with the council's president Adelaide Cabete, and Maria O'Neill, Vitória Pais Freire de Andrade and Aurora Teixeira de Castro, among others, she was a member of the organising committee, of the 1st Feminist and Education Congress, held in Lisbon from May 4 to 9, 1924. At this congress she made a presentation dealing with issues related to the teaching of children with disabilities. The second Congress, held four years later, discussed the topic of co-education at a time when the Estado Novo government was beginning to abolish co-education. In 1931 she represented the Council at the International Conference on Child Protection. Within the Council she specialised in matters related to education. Lopes Vieira also actively participated in teacher unions, including the Association of Teachers of Portugal, being on the secretariat of that association. She argued strongly that the government should open more schools, as a means of addressing the high levels of illiteracy common in Portugal of the time and that these should be schools for both sexes and for all social classes .

Lopes Vieira wrote for several publications, starting in 1909 with Amanhã, an anarchist magazine co-published by her husband, of which only six issues were published. Later she contributed to Alma feminina, the official bulletin of the Conselho Nacional das Mulheres Portuguesas, which was published until 1946. She also wrote for education magazines, notably Educação Social, published by Adolfo Lima and for the anarcho-syndicalist periodical A Batalha, which was published between 1919 and 1927.

Deolinda Lopes Vieira died on 6 June 1993 at the age of 104. With António Pinto Quartin, she had two daughters and one son. A street is named after her in the Portuguese town of Seixal.

References

1888 births
1993 deaths
People from Beja, Portugal
Portuguese republicans
Portuguese feminists
Portuguese educators
Portuguese women's rights activists
Portuguese anarchists